The University of Belgrade School of Electrical Engineering also known as Faculty of Electrical Engineering (/Elektrotehnički fakultet Univerziteta u Beogradu) is a constituent body of the University of Belgrade. The word Faculty in Europe stands for an academic institution, the sub-unit inside the university.

The first university level lecture in the field of electrical engineering in Serbia was held in 1894. Professor Stevan Marković was the first lecturer and founder of Electrical Engineering Chair within the Engineering department of the Belgrade Higher School. In 1898, Marković also founded the first electrical engineering laboratory in Serbia.

The school consists of a number of departments: Software Engineering, which is a separate department students enroll from year one, and the General Course, where from year two the students can select one of the following. Basic Electrical Engineering, Computer Science and Informatics, Telecommunications and Information Technology, Signal Processing and Automation, Power Engineering, Electronics Engineering and Physical Electronics.

History

The first university level lecture in the area of electrical engineering was held in 1894. Professor Stevan Markovic was the first lecturer and founder of Electrical Engineering Chair with Engineering department of Belgrade Higher School. Only four years later, Professor Markovic also founded electrical engineering laboratory. Since then, this area has been studied at the Higher School, and later at the University of Belgrade which developed from it. First diplomas in this area were given in 1922.

The education of electrical engineers has been considerably expanded after reorganization of the engineering department in 1935. The mechanical department became Mechanical Electrical Engineering department, within which, in 1937, four new departments were formed- mechanical, aeronautical, power systems engineering and telecommunications. Due to the lack of lab equipment forming of the fourth department (telecommunications) was postponed until the end of the Second World War. In 1946 the Department of Electrical Engineering was formed. That department grew into the School of Electrical Engineering two years later, with its Power Systems Engineering and Telecommunications departments. In 1955 a new department was founded - Physical Electronics.

In following years the Telecommunications department was broadened in the areas of electronics, automatics and computer science. The fourth department - Computer science - was formed in 1987.

The most recent addition is the department of Software Engineering, which was formed in 2004.

Starting with the 2017/2018 school year, 720 students enroll on the first year of the faculty, of which 540 are enrolling at the electrical and computer engineering department and 180 at the software engineering department.

Notable alumni
Some of the school's notable students include:

 Nenad Bogdanović
 Petar V. Kokotovic
 Branko Kovačević
 Miroslav Krstić 
 Mihajlo D. Mesarovic 
 Josip Pečarić 
 Dragoslav D. Šiljak
 Aleksandra Smiljanić 
 Milovan Stanković

See also
 University of Belgrade
 University of Novi Sad
 University of Novi Sad Faculty of Technical Sciences
 Higher education
 Tertiary education
 Electrical Engineering
 Electronics Engineering
 Computer Science
 Software Engineering

References

External links

 (in Serbian, English)

University of Belgrade schools
Education in Belgrade
Information technology institutes
Schools of informatics
Belgrade
Defense industry of Serbia
Electrical engineering departments
Palilula, Belgrade